Qingyuan is a town and the county seat of Qingyuan Manchu Autonomous County, Liaoning, China.

References
www.xzqh.org 

Towns in Liaoning